The Lin Sing Association is a Chinese American organization. The goals of the association are to improve the rights and welfare of its members.

Like many Overseas Chinese associations, the Lin Sing Association continues to fly the flag of the Republic of China alongside the U.S. flag, and recognizes it as the legitimate Chinese government as opposed to the People's Republic of China.

History
The Lin Sing Association was established in 1900. Initially, the association rented the top floor of 13 Pell Street, Chinatown, New York as their headquarters. On June 26, 1925, after raising over 70,000 dollars, the association purchased 45-49 Mott Street and moved its headquarters to its current location in 47-49 Mott Street.

Members
The Lin Sing Association is made up of 18 separate organizations.  They are:
 Hok Shan Society 鶴山公所
 Tsung Tsin Association 崇正會
 Chung Shan Association 中山同鄉會
 Tung On Association 東安公所
 Yee Shan Benevolent Society 番禺同鄉會
 Nam Shum Association 南順同鄉會
 Sun Wei Association 美國新會同鄉會
 Fay Chaw Merchants Association 惠州工商會
 Hai Nan Association 海南同鄉會
 Hoy Ping Association 開平同鄉會
 Tai Pun Yook Ying Association 大鵬育英社
 Fukien American Association 福建同鄉會
 Sam Kiang Charitable Association 三江公所
 Sze Kong Association 師公工商會
 Tai Look Merchants Association 太陸總商會
 Wah Pei Association 華北同鄉會
 Yan Ping Association 恩平同鄉會

References

External links
 Lin Sing Association official website

Chinese-American organizations
Chinese-American culture in New York City